Neomyxine biniplicata, the slender hagfish, is a species of hagfish endemic to New Zealand. It is known from along the east coast, from the northern end of the Bay of Plenty to Kaikoura at depths of 35–396 m, and is found on silty to coarse sediments and rocky seabeds.

References

Myxinidae
Marine fish of New Zealand
Taxa named by Laurence R. Richardson
Taxa named by Joy P. Jowett
Fish described in 1951